"Glory of Love" is a 1986 song performed by Peter Cetera, which he wrote and composed with his then-wife Diane Nini and David Foster. The song was recorded by Cetera shortly after he left the band Chicago to pursue a solo career. Featured in the film The Karate Kid Part II (1986), it was Cetera's first hit single after he left the band, reaching number one on the Billboard Hot 100, and it was included on his album Solitude/Solitaire (1986), which Michael Omartian produced.

"Glory of Love" peaked at number one on the US Billboard Hot 100 chart on August 2, 1986, remaining in that spot for two weeks. It also spent five weeks atop the US adult contemporary chart. Billboard ranked the power ballad as number fourteen on the Top Pop Singles of 1986, and number four on the Top Adult Contemporary Singles of 1986. The song achieved similar success in the UK, peaking at number three on the UK Singles Chart, where it was the 26th best-selling single of 1986.

Release and reception
"Glory of Love" made its first appearance on the Billboard Hot 100 in the US at number 62, for the week ending on June 7, 1986, and debuted at number 59 on the Cash Box Top 100 Singles chart that same date. In the same issue, Cash Box also shows the single as a new release.

The single has not been certified gold or platinum by the RIAA, although the record album that it appeared on, Solitude/Solitaire, has been certified both gold and platinum.

The song earned nominations for an Academy Award for Best Original Song, and a Golden Globe in the category of Best Original Song. It was also nominated for a Grammy Award in 1987 for Best Pop Vocal Performance by a Male Artist, and went on to win an ASCAP Award for Most Performed Songs from a Motion Picture and a BMI Film & TV Award for Most Performed Song from a Film.

Background
Cetera has said that he originally wrote and composed "Glory of Love" as the end title for the film Rocky IV (1985), but it was passed over by United Artists, instead ultimately being used as the theme for The Karate Kid Part II (1986).

The single of "Glory of Love" and the accompanying video were released in May 1986, while the album, Solitude/Solitaire, was released within days of the release of the movie, The Karate Kid Part II, a month later. Upon its release, the song was often incorrectly credited as being a new song performed by Cetera's former band Chicago owing to its similarity in style to many of the band's popular songs for which Cetera had been the lead vocalist.

Cetera performed a shortened version of the song live at the 59th Academy Awards ceremony, which took place on Monday, March 30, 1987, at the Dorothy Chandler Pavilion.

Music video
The music video by Peter Cetera is set in a Japanese martial arts dojo, with cut and fade scenes of the movie The Karate Kid Part II throughout. The video was directed by Peter Sinclair.

Personnel 
 Peter Cetera – vocals
 Michael Omartian – keyboards
 Willie Alexander – Fairlight CMI 
 Steve Azbill – PPG Waveterm programming
 Erich Bulling – synthesizers
 Dann Huff – guitars
 Paul Leim – drums
 Jeff Porcaro – percussion

Cover versions

David Foster in his 1991 album "David Foster Recordings".
Australian boy band North covered the song, which was released as their debut single from their 2004 self-titled debut album North, charting in a number of Asian music charts.
In 2000, the American band New Found Glory covered the song on their EP of soundtrack covers From the Screen to Your Stereo.
In 2010, Canadian artist Zameer released an acoustic version of the song on his album From Under the Bleachers. The single reached number 73 on the Canadian Hot 100 chart.
In 2011, the song was parodied by the Fringemunks as part of a medley that recapped Fringe episode 3.21, "The Last Sam Weiss."
In 2011, Canadian artist Karl Wolf greatly sampled the song in his released single "Ghetto Love" featuring Canadian rapper Kardinal Offishall. The single was released in Canada on Universal Republic. The music video for the release was by Director X and it was filmed in Jamaica. The song reached No. 20 on the Canadian Hot 100. A French version also exists, but retains the English-language chorus.
In 2019, Ninja Sex Party released a cover of this song on their album Under the Covers, Vol. III.

References in other media
"Glory of Love" was performed as the finale of the Irish stage show Riot in 2018 in Sydney, Australia.
"Glory of Love" plays while a woman runs over a man with a minivan in season 2, episode 3 of the NBC broadcast television series, Good Girls. The episode first aired on March 17, 2019.

B-side
The song "On the Line" which was on the B-side of the 45 rpm single was from Cetera's eponymously named first solo album, Peter Cetera, which had been released in 1981.

Charts

Weekly charts

Year-end charts

References

1986 songs
1986 singles
Peter Cetera songs
Billboard Hot 100 number-one singles
Cashbox number-one singles
Number-one singles in Sweden
RPM Top Singles number-one singles
Songs written by David Foster
Songs written by Peter Cetera
Songs written for films
The Karate Kid (franchise)
Song recordings produced by Michael Omartian
Warner Records singles